Vanadium(V) chloride is the inorganic compound with the formula VCl5.  It is a black diamagnetic solid. The molecules adopt a bioctahedral structure similar to that of niobium(V) chloride.

Preparation and reactions
Vanadium(V) chloride is prepared from the vanadium pentafluoride with excess boron trichloride:
2 VF5  +  10 BCl3  →   [VCl5]2  +  10 BF2Cl

It is unstable at room temperature with respect to vanadium(IV) chloride:
 [VCl5]2  →   2 VCl4  +  Cl2

In contrast, the heavier analogues NbCl5 and TaCl5 are stable and not particularly oxidizing.

References

Vanadium(V) compounds
Chlorides
Metal halides